This article lists the speakers of the Parliament of Iran, from the Persian Constitutional Revolution to present.

List of speakers

Speakers and deputies after the Revolution
Source:

Aging speakers
Traditionally, after a new term of the parliament is started and the new speaker is not elected yet, by default the eldest member of the parliament becomes the temporary speaker also known as the "Aging Speaker". The second-eldest member becomes his/her deputy. The two youngest members or Baby of the House take office as temporary secretaire.
Source:

See also
Senate of Iran

References

External links
Official website of the Parliament of the Islamic Republic of Iran

Iran
Main
Speaker